Viktoria Tokovaya (born 1 January 1976) is a Russian bobsledder who has competed since 1999. Competed in two Winter Olympics, she earned her best finish of seventh in the two-woman event at Turin in 2006.

Tokovaya also competed in the FIBT World Championships, earning her best finish of 12th in the two-woman event at Lake Placid in 2009.

References
 
 
 Bobsleighsport.com profile
 2002 bobsleigh two-woman results
 2006 bobsleigh two-woman results
 FIBT World Championships 2007 two-woman results

1976 births
Bobsledders at the 2002 Winter Olympics
Bobsledders at the 2006 Winter Olympics
Living people
Russian female bobsledders
Olympic bobsledders of Russia